A List of American films of 1913 is a compilation of American films that were released in the year 1913.

See also
 1913 in the United States

References

External links

1913 films at the Internet Movie Database

1913
Films
Lists of 1913 films by country or language
1910s in American cinema